William Tyner (28 May 1872 – 7 November 1954) was an Australian politician.

He was born in Prahran to produce merchant William Tyner and Letitia Anderson. He attended state schools before joining the family firm. On 27 February 1903 he married Martha Weller, with whom he had two daughters. He served on Caulfield City Council from 1910 to 1923 (as mayor from 1918 to 1919). In 1922 he was elected to the Victorian Legislative Council as a Nationalist, representing South Eastern Province. He served until 1940, when he was defeated contesting Higinbotham Province. Tyner died in Armadale in 1954.

References

1872 births
1954 deaths
Nationalist Party of Australia members of the Parliament of Victoria
United Australia Party members of the Parliament of Victoria
Members of the Victorian Legislative Council
People from Prahran, Victoria
Politicians from Melbourne